Fox Action Movies was a Southeast Asian pay television channel centered towards broadcasting action-themed and horror-themed films. It is owned by Fox Networks Group Asia Pacific. The channel's feed-in India was rebranded as Star Movies Action on 2 June 2013 while the Asian counterpart continued broadcasting. 5.1 Dolby Sound is available on HD channel only.

On 1 January 2021, Fox Action Movies ceased operations on SCTV16.
On 1 September 2021, Fox Action Movies ceased operations on Now TV.

On 27 September 2021, Fox Action Movies ceased operations and was replaced by Paramount Network on TransVision.

On 1 October 2021, Fox Action Movies ceased all operations, along with 17 other Fox/Disney-owned channels across Southeast Asia. The last film to air was Big Freaking Rat, however the Middle East and North Africa feed of the channel is still operating.

In November 2021, Cinemax HD is now replaced.

See also
 Astro (television)
 Fox Movies
 Fox Family Movies

References

External links
 Archived official site

Television channels and stations established in 2012
Television channels and stations disestablished in 2021
English-language television stations
Fox Networks Group
Fox Movies (TV channel)
Defunct television channels
Mass media in Southeast Asia
Cable television in Hong Kong
Movie channels in Singapore
Movie channels in Malaysia
Movie channels in Indonesia
Movie channels in Hong Kong
Movie channels in Thailand
Movie channels in the Philippines
Movie channels in Vietnam